Blackbeard's Castle is one of five National Historic Landmarks in the U.S. Virgin Islands.  It is located in the city of Charlotte Amalie, on the island of St. Thomas. Erected in 1679 by the Danes as a watchtower to protect the harbor as well as Fort Christian, Blackbeard's Castle was originally called Skytsborg (meaning protection castle). It is located at the highest point of Government Hill. Skytsborg served as a very effective vantage point for Danish soldiers to spot enemy ships. Fort Christian is at sea level, thus making it ideal for thwarting attackers with cannon fire; however, the fort itself did not provide an ideal view of incoming ships entering the harbor.  

It is not known what year Skytsborg took on the name of Blackbeard's Castle, but the infamous Edward Teach, commonly known as Blackbeard, did sail the Caribbean waters in the early 18th century.  It has become part of the lore of the island that he used the tower as a lookout for his own purposes of piracy.  It was the centerpiece of a private residence for many years, and was turned into a hotel, but is no longer open to the public.

See also
List of United States National Historic Landmarks in United States commonwealths and territories, associated states, and foreign states
National Register of Historic Places listings in the United States Virgin Islands

References

External links

 Official website: National Historic Landmark Program

National Register of Historic Places in the United States Virgin Islands
National Historic Landmarks in the United States Virgin Islands
Buildings and structures completed in 1679
Buildings and structures on the National Register of Historic Places in the United States Virgin Islands
Charlotte Amalie, U.S. Virgin Islands
1679 establishments in North America
Watchtowers
Buildings and structures in the United States Virgin Islands